Andrei Yevgenyevich Ivanov (6 April 1967 – 19 May 2009) was a Russian international footballer who played as left-back.

Honours
 Soviet Top League winner: 1989
 Russian Premier League winner: 1992, 1993
 Russian Premier League runner-up: 1994
 Russian Premier League bronze: 1995
 Soviet Cup winner: 1992
 Top 33 players year-end list: 1992, 1993

International career
He earned 15 caps for USSR, CIS and Russia, and was in the UEFA Euro 1992 as a member of the CIS team.

Post career
After retirement, he suffered from heavy alcoholism. He died in 2009 after pneumonia.

References

External links
Andrei Yevgenyevich Ivanov at RussiaTeam 

1967 births
2009 deaths
Soviet footballers
Soviet Union international footballers
Russian footballers
Russia international footballers
UEFA Euro 1992 players
FC Spartak Moscow players
FC Dynamo Moscow players
PFC CSKA Moscow players
SpVgg Greuther Fürth players
F.C. Alverca players
FC Tirol Innsbruck players
Soviet Top League players
Russian Premier League players
2. Bundesliga players
Expatriate footballers in Germany
Dual internationalists (football)
Alcohol-related deaths in Russia
FC Guria Lanchkhuti players
Russian expatriate footballers
Expatriate footballers in Austria
FC SKA-Khabarovsk players
Association football defenders
FC FShM Torpedo Moscow players
Russian expatriate sportspeople in Austria
Russian expatriate sportspeople in Germany
Expatriate footballers in Portugal
Russian expatriate sportspeople in Portugal